Mário Lúcio Costa Duarte (born 17 November 1980), commonly known as Aranha, is a Brazilian writer and former professional footballer who played as a goalkeeper.

His professional playing career spanned nearly 20 years, during which he was mainly associated with Santos and Ponte Preta. After retirement, Aranha became a writer, focusing his work in the racial issues in Brazil. He published a book about José do Patrocínio in 2022.

Club career

Ponte Preta
Born in Pouso Alegre, Minas Gerais, Aranha graduated from Ponte Preta's youth system. His nickname emerged in his hometown, through his coach at the time (Ailton Custódio), as a reference to the Soviet goalkeeper Lev Yashin, known as "Black Spider" due to his kits and his great defenses. 

Aranha served his first six professional years mostly as a third-choice, behind Alexandre Negri and Lauro. After the former's transfer to AC Ajaccio in 2004, and the latter's move to Cruzeiro in 2006, he was still unable to appear regularly, due to the arrival of Jean.

In the following year Jean left the side and Aranha was chosen as first-choice. On 21 February 2007, in a 0–1 loss at Villa Nova, he suffered a serious face injury which sidelined him for a month; after his return he saw a fellow youth graduate, Denis, in great form and was thus relegated to the bench.

In 2008, Aranha was named best goalkeeper of the Campeonato Paulista, with his side eventually finishing second, losing to Palmeiras. Despite attracted interest from other clubs, he remained at Ponte, signing a new three-year deal on 19 December 2008.

Atlético Mineiro
On 26 May 2009, Aranha moved to Atlético Mineiro, after long negotiations. With Galo he only achieved mid-table positions, and despite appearing regularly in his first season, he served as a backup to young Renan Ribeiro during his second. He was released by the club on 17 December 2010.

Santos
Four days after being released by Galo, Aranha joined Santos. He served his first two seasons initially as a backup to Rafael Cabral, and extended his contract until the end of the 2013 season.

In July 2013, after the departure of Rafael to Napoli, Aranha was handed the first-choice goalkeeper status in the squad, and was later praised for his performances. On 31 August he signed a new two-year deal, remaining at Santos until 2015.

On 13 January 2015, after his deal expired, Aranha took legal action against Santos due to unpaid wages, the fifth player to do so. Eight days later, he rejected two proposals of rescision from Santos, preferring to wait for another decision from the court; he subsequently canceled his legal action against the club.

Palmeiras
On 2 February 2015, Aranha signed a one-year deal with fellow league team Palmeiras, mainly as a backup to Fernando Prass. He started only one match for the club, a 2-2 draw against Ituano on 9 April 2015, and became a free agent after his contract expired at the end of the year.

Joinville / Ponte Preta return
In June 2016, the 35-year-old Aranha signed a short-term deal with Campeonato Brasileiro Série B team Joinville. On 9 August, he returned to Ponte Preta.

Racism incidents
On 28 August 2014, when Santos was facing Grêmio in Porto Alegre for the Round of 16 of the 2014 Copa do Brasil, Aranha was called macaco (monkey) by Grêmio supporters. He also accused them of making monkey sounds to provoke him. Grêmio later issued a statement in which the club condemns the acts of racism and promises to help identifying the racist supporters. The episode led to the return match against Grêmio being suspended until Brazil's superior sporting court can examine the case - the outcome could include Grêmio being disqualified from the championship, a punishment that was indeed made official on 3 September 2014.

On 21 January 2015, Aranha was again victim of racist acts, this time from a very small part of Santos' supporters, through a Facebook group. The people who insulted the player were reprimanded and subsequently excluded from the group.

Career statistics

Honours

Club
Santos
Campeonato Paulista: 2011, 2012
Copa Libertadores: 2011
Recopa Sudamericana: 2012

Palmeiras
Copa do Brasil: 2015

Individual
Campeonato Paulista Team of the year: 2017

References

External links

1980 births
Living people
Sportspeople from Minas Gerais
Brazilian footballers
Association football goalkeepers
Campeonato Brasileiro Série A players
Campeonato Brasileiro Série B players
Associação Atlética Ponte Preta players
Clube Atlético Mineiro players
Santos FC players
Sociedade Esportiva Palmeiras players
Joinville Esporte Clube players